Blommenholm is a district in the municipality of Bærum, Norway. Its population (2007) is 2,936.

It is served by the train station Blommenholm on the Drammen Line.

References

Neighbourhoods in Bærum
Villages in Akershus